The men's football tournament at the 2016 Summer Olympics was held in Rio de Janeiro and five other cities in Brazil from 4 to 20 August 2016. It was the 26th edition of the men's Olympic football tournament. Together with the women's competition, the 2016 Summer Olympics football tournament was held in six cities in Brazil, including Olympic host city Rio de Janeiro, which hosted the final at the Maracanã Stadium. Teams participating in the men's competition were restricted to under-23 players (born on or after 1 January 1993) with a maximum of three overage players allowed.

In March 2016, it was agreed that the competition would be part of IFAB's trial to allow a fourth substitute to be made during extra time.

Brazil captured their first gold medal after defeating Germany on penalties. Nigeria won the bronze medal by beating Honduras 3–2.

Competition schedule
The match schedule of the men's tournament was unveiled on 10 November 2015.

Qualification
In addition to host nation Brazil, 15 men's national teams qualified from six separate continental confederations. FIFA ratified the distribution of spots at the executive committee meeting in March 2014.

Dates and venues are those of final tournaments (or final round of qualification tournaments), various qualification stages may precede matches at these specific venues.
Nations making their Olympic tournament debut

Match officials
On 2 May 2016, FIFA released the list of match referees that would officiate at the Olympics.

Venues

The tournament was held in seven venues across six cities:
Mineirão, Belo Horizonte
Estádio Nacional Mané Garrincha, Brasília
Arena da Amazônia, Manaus
Maracanã, Rio de Janeiro
Estádio Olímpico João Havelange, Rio de Janeiro
Itaipava Arena Fonte Nova, Salvador
Arena Corinthians, São Paulo

Squads

The men's tournament was an under-23 international tournament (born on or after 1 January 1993), with a maximum of three overage players allowed. Each team had to submit a squad of 18 players, two of whom had to be goalkeepers. Each team might also have a list of four alternate players, who might replace any player in the squad in case of injury during the tournament.

Draw
The draw for the tournament was held on 14 April 2016, 10:30 BRT (UTC−3), at the Maracanã Stadium, Rio de Janeiro. The 16 teams in the men's tournament were drawn into four groups of four teams. The teams were seeded into four pots based on their performances in the five previous Olympics (with more recent tournaments weighted higher), plus bonus points awarded to the six confederation qualifying champions (Japan, Nigeria, Mexico, Argentina, Fiji, Sweden). The hosts Brazil were automatically assigned into position A1. No groups could contain more than one team from the same confederation.

Group stage
The top two teams of each group advanced to the quarter-finals. The rankings of teams in each group were determined as follows:
 Points obtained in all group matches;
 Goal difference in all group matches;
 Number of goals scored in all group matches;
If two or more teams were equal on the basis of the above three criteria, their rankings were determined as follows:
 Points obtained in the group matches between the teams concerned;
 Goal difference in the group matches between the teams concerned;
 Number of goals scored in the group matches between the teams concerned;
 Drawing of lots by the FIFA Organising Committee.

Group A

Group B

Group C

Group D

Knockout stage

In the knockout stage, if a match was level at the end of normal playing time, extra time was played (two periods of fifteen minutes each) and followed, if necessary, by a penalty shoot-out to determine the winner.

On 18 March 2016, the FIFA Executive Committee agreed that the competition would be part of the International Football Association Board's trial to allow a fourth substitute to be made during extra time.

Quarter-finals

Semi-finals

Bronze medal match

Gold medal match

Goalscorers
6 goals

 Serge Gnabry
 Nils Petersen

4 goals

 Neymar
 Maximilian Meyer
 Erick Gutiérrez
 Oghenekaro Etebo
 Umar Sadiq

3 goals

 Gabriel Jesus
 Luan
 Teo Gutiérrez
 Anthony Lozano
 Kwon Chang-hoon
 Ryu Seung-woo
 Suk Hyun-jun
 Gonçalo Paciência

2 goals

 Sofiane Bendebka
 Gabriel
 Dorlan Pabón
 Matthias Ginter
 Davie Selke
 Alberth Elis
 Marcelo Pereira
 Takuma Asano
 Son Heung-min
 Aminu Umar

1 goal

 Mohamed Benkablia
 Baghdad Bounedjah
 Jonathan Calleri
 Ángel Correa
 Mauricio Martínez
 Marquinhos
 Robert Skov
 Roy Krishna
 Lukas Klostermann
 Philipp Max
 Romell Quioto
 Saad Abdul-Amir
 Shinzo Koroki
 Takumi Minamino
 Shoya Nakajima
 Musashi Suzuki
 Shinya Yajima
 Oribe Peralta
 Rodolfo Pizarro
 Carlos Salcedo
 John Obi Mikel
 Tobias Figueiredo
 Pité
 Hwang Hee-chan
 Gift Motupa
 Astrit Ajdarević
 Mikael Ishak

Own goals
 Hiroki Fujiharu (playing against Colombia)

Final ranking

See also
 Football at the 2016 Summer Olympics – Women's tournament

References

External links

Football – Men, Rio2016.com
Men's Olympic Football Tournament, Rio 2016, FIFA.com
FIFA Technical Report

 
Men